The Basel–Pratteln railway line is a  railway line in Switzerland. Basler Verkehrs-Betriebe operates line 14 of the Basel tram network over the line.

History 
The  opened a line from the existing tram network at Schänzli, on the river Birs, to Muttenz, on 22 January 1921. The line was further extended to its present terminus in Pratteln, near the Swiss Federal Railways station there, on 20 October 1922. The line was electrified from opening at 550 V DC, later increased to 600 V DC. In 1974, the Basellandschaftliche Ueberlandbahn merged with three other companies to form Baselland Transport. A  proposed extension northeast to the  area was rejected by voters in 2021.

Route 
It runs east-west, roughly parallel to the standard gauge Hauenstein Railway, and runs through the municipalities of Pratteln and Muttenz. The line is double-tracked, running at-grade on dedicated right-of-way. It crosses the river Birs near St. Jakob-Park, where it connects with the Basel tram network.

Operation 
Basler Verkehrs-Betriebe operates line 14 of the Basel tram network over the line.

Notes

References 

 
 

Railway lines in Switzerland
Railway lines opened in 1921
1921 establishments in Switzerland
Baselland Transport lines
Metre gauge railways in Switzerland
600 V DC railway electrification